Rafael Nadal defeated the five-time defending champion Roger Federer in the final, 6–4, 6–4, 6–7(5–7), 6–7(8–10), 9–7 to win the gentlemen's singles tennis title at the 2008 Wimbledon Championships. It was his fifth major title, and his first outside of the French Open. It was also the first time Federer lost a major final outside the French Open. It would be Federer's only loss at Wimbledon between 2003 and 2009. The final marked the third of three consecutive Wimbledon finals contested by Federer and Nadal, with Federer emerging victorious in the two prior encounters. It was the second-longest championship match in Wimbledon history with play lasting 4 hours and 48 minutes, and with two rain delays. The event stretched over seven hours ending just before nightfall, and is considered by many to be the greatest match in tennis history.

Seeds

  Roger Federer (final)
  Rafael Nadal (champion)
  Novak Djokovic (second round)
  Nikolay Davydenko (first round)
  David Ferrer (third round)
  Andy Roddick (second round)
  David Nalbandian (first round)
  Richard Gasquet (fourth round)
  James Blake (second round)
  Marcos Baghdatis (fourth round)
  Tomáš Berdych (third round)
  Andy Murray (quarterfinals)
  Stan Wawrinka (fourth round)
  Paul-Henri Mathieu (third round)
  Fernando González (second round)
  Radek Štěpánek (third round)

  Mikhail Youzhny (fourth round)
  Ivo Karlović (first round)
  Nicolás Almagro (second round)
  Lleyton Hewitt (fourth round)
  Juan Carlos Ferrero (second round, retired due to a neck injury)
  Fernando Verdasco (fourth round)
  Tommy Robredo (second round)
  Jarkko Nieminen (second round)
  Dmitry Tursunov (third round)
  Ivan Ljubičić (first round)
  Nicolas Kiefer (third round)
  Gilles Simon (third round)
  Andreas Seppi (third round)
  Gaël Monfils (withdrew)
  Feliciano López (quarterfinals)
  Michaël Llodra (first round, retired due to a left arm injury)

Gaël Monfils withdrew due to a shoulder injury. He was replaced in the draw by lucky loser Ilija Bozoljac.

Qualifying

Draw

Finals

Top half

Section 1

Section 2

Section 3

Section 4

Bottom half

Section 5

Section 6

Section 7

Section 8

References

External links

 2008 Wimbledon Championships – Men's draws and results at the International Tennis Federation

Men's Singles
Wimbledon Championship by year – Men's singles